NNMC may refer to:

 National Naval Medical Center
 Northern New Mexico College in Espanola, New Mexico